Here's to You is the fourth and final album by vocalist David Oliver.

Track listing
Love TKO 	5:00 	
She's a Lady 	3:57 	
Easier Being Friends 	4:49 	
My Lady 	5:25 	
Behind Closed Doors 	5:27 	
It Was Fun While It Lasted 	5:23 	
You've Got My Love with You - Lynn's Song 	2:49 	
The Masquerade Is Over 	7:03

Personnel
David Oliver – lead and backing vocals
Ed Reddick, Nathaniel Phillips – bass
James Gadson, Raymond Calhoun – drums
Arthur Adams, Kimbo – guitar
Eddie "Gip" Noble – keyboards
John Skykun – synthesizer
Ernie Watts – English horn, flute, saxophone
Bill Green – clarinet, saxophone, flute
Sidney Muldrow – French horn
Bobby Bryant, Oscar Brashear – flugelhorn, trumpet
Garnett Brown, George Bohanon, Jimmy Cleveland, Maurice Spears – trombone
Augie Johnson, Jim Gilstrap, Marlena Jeter, Miki Howard – backing vocals

References

1980 albums
David Oliver (singer) albums
Mercury Records albums
Albums produced by Wayne Henderson (musician)